The Lenny Henry Show is a comedy sketch show (and in its 1987–1988 incarnation, a sitcom) featuring Lenny Henry. 
It was originally broadcast between 1984 and 1988, and was later revived twice, in 1995 and 2004–2005.

History

Original version (1984–1985)
The original version of the show ran for two series on BBC 1 in 1984 and 1985. Each series had six episodes. A 40-minute special was aired in December 1987. Recurring guests include Nicholas Lyndhurst (3 episodes) and Robbie Coltrane (2 episodes). Bands featured on the 1984 series included Musical Youth and Second Image.

Sitcom incarnation (1987–1988)
Two further series broadcast in 1987–1988 kept the same name, but followed a sitcom (rather than sketch-based) format. This version starred Henry as Delbert Wilkins, a well-meaning but trouble-prone pirate radio DJ. At the end, Wilkins went "legit", gaining a job with the BBC World Service, and a son.

1995 revival
The show was revived for one series in 1995; it failed to pick up audiences and was cancelled after its first run.

2004–2005 revival
Lenny Henry revived the format once again in 2004 for two series of 8 episodes, containing stand-up and recurring sketches with recurring appearances by Gina Yashere.

2020 Radio 4 revival
The show was revived for a six-part BBC Radio 4 series in 2020.

Transmissions

Series

Specials

References

External links

BBC television sketch shows
1984 British television series debuts
2005 British television series endings
1980s British television sketch shows
1990s British television sketch shows
2000s British television sketch shows
English-language television shows
British television series revived after cancellation
Television series by Tiger Aspect Productions
Television series about radio
2020 radio programme debuts
2020 radio programme endings
BBC Radio comedy programmes
British radio sketch shows
Lenny Henry Show